LaValle (sometimes spelled La Valle) is an unincorporated community in Stoddard County, in the U.S. state of Missouri.

History
A post office called "La Valle" was established in 1903, and remained in operation until 1953. The community has the name of John LaValle, an early settler.

References

Unincorporated communities in Stoddard County, Missouri
Unincorporated communities in Missouri
1903 establishments in Missouri